Glenn Miller is a compilation album of phonograph records released posthumously by bandleader Glenn Miller and His Orchestra. Released in 1945 on RCA Victor as a part of the Victor Musical Smart Set series, described on the front cover as "An Album of Outstanding Arrangements on Victor Records", the set was number one for a total of 16 weeks on the newly created Billboard album charts. The album, also known under the title Glenn Miller and His Orchestra, was certified Gold in July 1968 by the RIAA.

Track listing
These reissued songs were featured on a 4-disc, 78 rpm album set, RCA Victor P-148, containing 20-1564/20-1565/20-1566/20-1567.

Disc 1: (20-1564)

Disc 2: (20-1565)

Disc 3: (20-1566)

Disc 4: (20-1567)

Personnel

The personnel for the April 4, 1939 "Moonlight Serenade" recording session in New York consisted of: Bob Price, Legh Knowles, Dale McMickle, on trumpet; Glenn Miller, Al Mastren, Paul Tanner, on trombone; Wilbur Schwartz, on clarinet and alto saxophone; Hal McIntyre, on alto saxophone; Stanley Aronson, on alto and baritone saxophone; Tex Beneke, Al Klink, on tenor saxophone; Chummy MacGregor, on piano; Allen Reuss, on guitar; Rowland "Rolly" Bundock, on string bass; and Frank Carlson, on drums.

The personnel for "American Patrol": Saxes: Tex  Beneke, Wilbur Schwartz, Ernie Caceres, Al Klink, Lloyd "Skip" Martin; Trumpets: John Best, R. D. McMickle, Billy May, Steve Lipkins; Trombones: Glenn Miller, Jimmy Priddy, Paul Tanner, Frank D'Annolfo; Piano: Chummy MacGregor; String Bass: Edward "Doc" Goldberg; Guitar: Bobby Hackett; Drums: Moe Purtill.

The personnel for "Song of the Volga Boatmen": Saxes: Hal McIntyre, Tex  Beneke, Wilbur Schwartz, Ernie Caceres, Al Klink; Trumpets: John Best, R. D. McMickle, Billy May, Ray Anthony; Trombones: Glenn Miller, Jimmy Priddy, Paul Tanner, Frank D'Annolfo; Piano: Chummy MacGregor; String Bass: Herman "Trigger" Alpert; Guitar: Jack Lathrop; Drums: Moe Purtill.

The personnel for "Tuxedo Junction": Saxes: Hal McIntyre, Tex  Beneke, Wilbur Schwartz, Jimmy Abato, Al Klink; Trumpets: Clyde Hurley, John Best, R. D. McMickle, Legh Knowles; Trombones: Glenn Miller, Tommy Mack, Paul Tanner, Frank D'Annolfo; Piano: Chummy MacGregor; String Bass: Rowland Bundock; Guitar: Richard Fisher; Drums: Moe Purtill.

The personnel for "In the Mood": Saxes: Hal McIntyre, Tex  Beneke, Wilbur Schwartz, Harold Tennyson, Al Klink; Trumpets: Clyde Hurley, R. D. McMickle, Legh Knowles; Trombones: Glenn Miller, Paul Tanner, Al Mastren; Piano: Chummy MacGregor; String Bass: Rowland Bundock; Guitar: Richard Fisher; Drums: Moe Purtill.

The personnel for "Little Brown Jug": Saxes: Hal McIntyre, Tex  Beneke, Wilbur Schwartz, Stanley Aronson, Al Klink; Trumpets: Bob Price, R. D. McMickle, Legh Knowles; Trombones: Glenn Miller, Paul Tanner, Al Mastren; Piano: Chummy MacGregor; String Bass: Rowland Bundock; Guitar: Allen Reuss; Drums: Moe Purtill.

The personnel for "Stardust": Saxes: Hal McIntyre, Tex  Beneke, Wilbur Schwartz, Jimmy Abato, Al Klink; Trumpets: Clyde Hurley, John Best, R. D. McMickle, Legh Knowles; Trombones: Glenn Miller, Howard Gibeling, Paul Tanner, Frank D'Annolfo; Piano: Chummy MacGregor; String Bass: Rowland Bundock; Guitar: Richard Fisher; Drums: Moe Purtill.

The personnel for "Pennsylvania Six-Five Thousand": Saxes: Hal McIntyre, Tex  Beneke, Wilbur Schwartz, Ernie Caceres, Al Klink; Trumpets: John Best, R. D. McMickle, Clyde Hurley, Legh Knowles; Trombones: Glenn Miller, Jimmy Priddy, Paul Tanner, Frank D'Annolfo; Piano: Chummy MacGregor; String Bass: Herman "Trigger" Alpert; Guitar: Jack Lathrop; Drums: Moe Purtill.

Reception

Consisting of new pairings of Miller's hit singles on four 10" 78 rpm records, and subtitled An Album of Outstanding Arrangements on Victor Records, Glenn Miller was a highly successful release. As a part of Victor's Musical Smart Set series, the album reached number one on May 12, 1945, and held the slot for 8 weeks in 1945, 5 weeks in 1946, and 3 weeks in 1947 on the nascent Billboard album charts. It saw reissued release on 10" LP and 45 rpm album formats as RCA Victor LPM-31 and P-148, respectively. The album was also released in Canada.

References

Additional sources
Simon, George Thomas (1980). Glenn Miller and His Orchestra. New York: Da Capo paperback. .
Simon, George Thomas (1971). Simon Says. New York: Galahad. .
Schuller, Gunther (1991). The Swing Era:the Development of Jazz, Volume 2. 1930–1945. New York: Oxford University Press. .

Glenn Miller compilation albums
1945 compilation albums
RCA Victor compilation albums